Rileya is a genus of parasitoid hymenopteran named and described in 1888. It belongs to the Eurytomidae. There are 27 species currently assigned to the genus.

History and taxonomy
The genus was named in 1888 by William Harris Ashmead as belonging to the Eurytominae and during the same year, the same genus was named Rileya by Howard (albeit Howard incorrectly described Rileya as part of the Chalcididae), although Ashmead (1888) takes priority since they were the first to describe the genus. In 1902, Friedrich von Huene named the phytosaur Rileya, without knowing that the name was already preoccupied. In 1961, Oskar Kuhn renamed it from Rileya to Rileyasuchus, realising that the name used for the phytosaur was preoccupied.

References

Eurytomidae
Hymenoptera genera